is a Japanese politician, the general-secretary of the Democratic Party for the People (DPFP). He is serving as a member of the House of Councillors.

Early life 
Kazuya Shinba was born in Ogasa District, Shizuoka. His father, Tatsuo Shinba (榛葉達夫) was served as the governor of Kikugawa.

Education 

After graduating from a high school in Shizuoka, he attended Otterbein College, Ohio and then he pursued his graduate study at Hebrew University of Jerusalem, Israel.

Political career 
He was elected to the House of Councillors for the first time in 2001, after serving in the town assembly of Kikugawa, Shizuoka. In 2009, he was appointed to the post of Deputy Minister of Defence by the Minister of Defence, Toshimi Kitazawa.

References

External links 
  in Japanese.

|-

|-

|-

|-

Members of the House of Councillors (Japan)
Otterbein University alumni
Tel Aviv University alumni
Hebrew University of Jerusalem alumni
Living people
1967 births
Democratic Party of Japan politicians